The Lawrence Herbert School of Communication is the communications school at Hofstra University. It has 11 distinct degrees ranging from Journalism and Public Relations to Filmmaking and Radio Production.

The school was named for alumnus Lawrence Herbert in 2013, for his career accomplishments including the invention of the Pantone system.

The current dean is Mark Lukasiewicz, who was a former news executive for both ABC News and NBC News.
1,108 students are enrolled as of Fall 2016.

The school is home to numerous programs, including WRHU, the school's radio station which has won numerous accolades, most notably four Marconi Radio Awards for College Station of the Year. The network has also been the radio home of the New York Islanders since the 2010–2011 season. Other notable programs include the HEAT Network, and the Hofstra Chronicle among others.

Academics

Degrees
 Bachelor of Arts in Audio/Radio Production and Studies
 Bachelor of Arts in Film Studies and Production
 Bachelor of Arts in Journalism 
 Bachelor of Arts in Mass Media Studies
 Bachelor of Arts in Public Relations
 Bachelor of Arts in Television Production and Studies
 Bachelor of Fine Arts in Filmmaking
 Bachelor of Fine Arts in Writing for the Screen
 Bachelor of Science in Video/Television
 Bachelor of Science in Video/Television and Business
 Bachelor of Science in Video/Television and Film
 Master of Arts in Journalism
 Master of Arts in Public Relations

Accreditation
The school's Journalism department is accredited by the Accrediting Council on Education in Journalism and Mass Communications.

Notable alumni
Shirleen Allicot '04, news anchor at WABC-TV
Amanda Balionis '08, CBS Sports reporter
Ryan Broderick '12, former writer at BuzzFeed, Gawker and Vice
Katie Nolan '09, host of ESPN's Always Late with Katie Nolan
Joe Pantorno '13, sportswriter
Andrew Rea ‘09, creator of Babish Culinary Universe
Brandon 'Scoop B' Robinson '11, television analyst at MSG Networks
Steve Rubel, Chief Media Ecologist at Edelman
Faridah Demola Seriki '13, Grammy Award-nominated artist
Lance Ulanoff '86, Editor-In Chief of Lifewire
Jay Wallace '00, President and Executive Editor of Fox News

References

Hofstra University
Journalism schools in the United States
1995 establishments in New York (state)
Educational institutions established in 1995